Shakima Wimbley (born April 23, 1995) is an American sprinter. She competed in the women's 4 × 400 metres relay at the 2017 World Championships in Athletics.

Competition record

References

External links
 

1995 births
Living people
American female sprinters
World Athletics Championships athletes for the United States
Place of birth missing (living people)
World Athletics Championships medalists
World Athletics Indoor Championships winners
USA Outdoor Track and Field Championships winners
World Athletics Indoor Championships medalists
World Athletics Championships winners
Pan American Games medalists in athletics (track and field)
Pan American Games gold medalists for the United States
Pan American Games silver medalists for the United States
Athletes (track and field) at the 2015 Pan American Games
Medalists at the 2015 Pan American Games
21st-century American women